Ignaz Glaser (5 May 1853 – 11 August 1916) was an Austrian businessman from Prague and the founder of one of the biggest sheet glass factories in the k.u.k. monarchy.

Biography
In 1881 in Bürmoos near Salzburg he used the legal estate of a former glassworks company that went bankrupt four years earlier and he bought a giant moor area. He expanded the factory with four glass ovens, which worked with turf.
He also founded a brickyard, which was very successful and which existed throughout the 1970s. Bit by bit he then bought further moor areas in the neighboring Weidmoos and at Ibmer moor, where he also started to cultivate hops. In the middle of the Ibmer area, in Hackenbuch, Upper Austria, he established another glass factory. The turf factory was very unstable because it depended on the weather a lot and the turf supplies drew to a close. Thus Glaser bought a closed sugar factory in North Bohemian Brüx and established a new glass factory. In that factory ovens were heated with coal from an open pit, which made the company independent from weather conditions. After Glaser’s death in 1916, his son Dr. Hermann Glaser, born on 18 August 1889, took over the glass factory, which experienced a short economic boom after World War I. But then the company missed the update to mechanical flat glass fabrication and the Glaser empire broke down in 1926. In Bürmoos, flat glass was produced by a company named Stiassny until the end of 1929, which then bought the holdings. At this point glass fabrication was shut down totally. Eighty percent of the population there was unemployed.

Glaser's grave is in the Jewish cemetery in Salzburg–Aigen. His son survived the Holocaust in Shanghai and died on 10 January 1956 in Vienna.

In 2006 the first Ignaz-Glaser-Symposium organized by Andreas Maislinger with a focus on integration took place.

Literature
 Commercial Register Ignaz Glaser - unpublished.
 Georg Rendl, Die Glasbläser von Bürmoos. Romantrilogie. Verlag Kremayr & Scheriau, Vienna 1951.

Austrian businesspeople
Businesspeople from Prague
Austro-Hungarian Jews
1853 births
1916 deaths
People from Salzburg-Umgebung District